Anna-Lena Grönefeld and Květa Peschke were the defending champions, but chose not to participate.
Karolína Plíšková and Kristýna Plíšková won the title, defeating Gabriela Dabrowski and Alicja Rosolska in the final, 7–6(8–6), 6–4.

Seeds

Draw

Draw

References
 Main Draw

Generali Ladies Linz - Doubles
Generali Ladies Linz Doubles